Şırdan is one of the well known food in Adana, which is a southern city of Turkey. Adana Kebap, Şalgam and Şırdan are very popular in Turkey.

Preparation
The širden is prepared in this way: the elastic muscle organ, abomasum, of sheep or lamb is well washed and stuffed with a filling of three kinds of chopped meat, onions and paprika and seasoned with black pepper, pimento and salt. A little water is added and the opening is sewn with a needle and a thread. It is baked with animal fat in an earthen casserole.

Macedonian cuisine
Turkish cuisine